Wild Animals is Korean director Kim Ki-duk's second film, released in 1997. It is a crime-drama film set in Paris, and stars Cho Jae-hyun, Dong-jik Jang and Ryun Jang.

Synopsis
A North Korean and a South Korean meet each other by chance in Paris and become involved in the intrigues of the Paris underworld.

Cast

References

External links 
 

1997 films
Films directed by Kim Ki-duk
South Korean independent films
1990s French-language films
1990s Korean-language films
South Korean crime drama films
Films about North Korea–South Korea relations
Films set in Paris